Thorpe Salvin is a civil parish in the Metropolitan Borough of Rotherham, South Yorkshire, England.  The parish contains 14 listed buildings that are recorded in the National Heritage List for England.  Of these, one is listed at Grade I, the highest of the three grades, two are at Grade II*, the middle grade, and the others are at Grade II, the lowest grade.  The parish contains the village of Thorpe Salvin and the surrounding countryside.  The Chesterfield Canal runs through the parish, and the listed buildings associated with this are locks, bridges, milestones, and an aqueduct.  The other listed buildings consist of a church, headstones and a sundial in the churchyard, the ruins of a manor house and its gatehouse, and a row of cottages.


Key

Buildings

References

Citations

Sources

 

Lists of listed buildings in South Yorkshire
Buildings and structures in the Metropolitan Borough of Rotherham